You Can't Fool Your Wife is a lost 1923 American silent drama film directed by George Melford and written by Waldemar Young. The film stars Leatrice Joy, Nita Naldi, Lewis Stone, Pauline Garon, Paul McAllister and John Daly Murphy. The film was released on April 29, 1923, by Paramount Pictures.

Plot summary

Cast
 Leatrice Joy as Edith McBride
 Nita Naldi as Ardrita Saneck
 Lewis Stone as Garth McBride
 Pauline Garon as Vera Redell
 Paul McAllister as Dr. Konrad Saneck
 John Daly Murphy as Jackson Redell
 Julia Swayne Gordon as Lillian Redell
 Thomas Carrigan as Russell Fenton
 Daniel Pennell as John Yates

References

External links

 
 
 
 
 Australian daybill long poster
 American lobby poster

Famous Players-Lasky films
Silent American drama films
Lost American films
1923 drama films
Paramount Pictures films
Films directed by George Melford
American black-and-white films
American silent feature films
1923 lost films
Lost drama films
1920s American films
1920s English-language films
English-language drama films